All About Records was an American record label founded in 1997 by Russell Orcutt Released albums by such bands as Tokyo Rose, Smackin' Isaiah, and Lanemeyer.

History
Russ Orcutt founded All About Records to release a 7" for his friends in new bedford hardcore outfit All Chrome in 1997. The label quickly grew with releases from bands such as The Action Taken, later named Have Heart and Tokyo Rose's Chasing Fireflies EP which received distribution through The Militia Group.

In later years, The label expanded to the United Kingdom and focused on selling merch geared towards comicon event goers.

Inactive artists 
 The Action Taken
 Adams Shore
 All Chrome
 Another Option
 Arcade Academy
 Blackletter
 Brookside
 Calumet-Hecla
 Chase the moment
 The Chase Scene
 The Cheat!
 Damaged Goods
 Do it for Johnny
 Drive til' Morning
 Dyingforit
 Eighty-Six
 End it all
 Farwell Hope
 Garrison
 Jeff Caudill
 Jericho (now known as Smoke or Fire)
 Jesuscentric
 Kobe
 Lanemeyer
 Orange Island
 The Passing Moment
 Remember Paris (now known as The Drama State)
 Run Like Hell
 Select Start
 Smackin' Isaiah
 Sometimes She Burns
 Stereoepic
 Tokyo Rose
 Windmill
The Forever Endeavor

References 

American record labels
Culture of Boston
Record labels established in 1997
Alternative rock record labels
Companies based in Bristol County, Massachusetts
Punk record labels
Taunton, Massachusetts